Adrian Mannarino was the defending champion, but chose not to compete this year.

Daniel Evans won the title ,  defeating Frances Tiafoe in the final 5–7, 6–1, 6–3 .

Seeds

Draw

Finals

Top half

Bottom half

References
 Main Draw
 Qualifying Draw

Knoxville Challenger
Knoxville Challenger